Juliane Mogge (born 5 March 1990) is a German Paralympic athlete who competes at international track and field competitions in the shot put. She is a World silver medalist and a two-time European bronze medalist.

References

External links
 
 

1990 births
Living people
German female shot putters
Paralympic athletes of Germany
Athletes (track and field) at the 2016 Summer Paralympics
Athletes (track and field) at the 2020 Summer Paralympics
Medalists at the World Para Athletics Championships
Medalists at the World Para Athletics European Championships
Sportspeople from Kassel
20th-century German women
21st-century German women